T. V. John Langworthy (born John Alan Langworthy, August 20, 1947) is an American songwriter singer, composer, television personality, comedian and dream-reenactment music video producer. Not knowing how to play a musical instrument, he has recorded over 6,000 songs a cappella from his dreams. In his Maxern Records studio, he has subsequently recorded and released hundreds of dream songs with his Legendary Band.

Langworthy attributes the start of his career to a 1985 experience where God spoke to him in a dream, and, since then, he states his dreams have been filled with "heaven-sent" songs - despite his having no prior musical background.

Career
Langworthy was born into a United States Air Force family in San Antonio, Texas. Consequently, he attended thirty-seven schools throughout the United States and Germany, before attending college at the University of Massachusetts where he earned a Bachelor of Arts in European History. He received a full scholarship in San Francisco's acting school at The American Conservatory Theater. He then traveled around the world from 1969 to 1972. in 1992, Langworthy quit his day job as a Yellow Pages advertising salesman, and he formed The Legendary Band.

His one-hour public-access television program The T.V. John Show showcases songwriters, where he opens and closes each show 
with dream songs. The internet provides worldwide distribution for his songs, music videos and television programs. TBD.com of ABC's 
Channel 8 News in Arlington, Virginia called Langworthy “the most interesting personality of our time.”

Langworthy is the sole proprietor of Maxern Records, the record company that records his dream songs and makes his music videos.

Discography

 Dream Songs (1991)
 Dream Power (1993)
 Dream Maker (1993)
 Dream On (1994)
 T.V. John Live at Backstreets Café (2006)
 T.V. John Live at the Lone Star Grill (2007)
 Dreamzzz (2008)
 Sunrise Dreams (2008)
 Dream Realities (2009)
 T.V. John Live at Green Island Café (2010)
 Dream Album (2010)
 Vivid Dreams (2010)
 Dream Catcher (2011)
 In Your Dreams (2011)
 Dream Treasures (2012)
 Dream Horizons (2012)
 Dream Revelations (2012)
 Dream Tracks (2013)
 Dream Patterns (2013)
 Dream Tunes (2013)
 Best Dream Hits (2013)
 Dream Gifts (2014)
 Beyond Dreams (2014)
 Dreaming of You (2015)
 Dream Maestro (2015)
 Dream Harvest (2015)
 Dream Life (2015)
 Oh, Dream On, You Dream Dreaming Dreamer Dream Dream (2016)
 Dream Hopes (2016)
 Dream Until Your Dreams Come True (2016)
 Dreaming Dreamer (2016)
 Dream On Honey (ETA February 2017)

References
1. Margaret Flynn, “Fremonter hopes tour sets record” (Fremont, Ohio: The News-Messenger, July 16, 1992), p. 19. Jeff Yost sings his originals on television for The T.V. John Show. 
2. Buzz McClain, “Potomac Songwriter Living His Dream” (Alexandria, Virginia: The Montgomery Journal, August 28, 1992), pp. B-1 and B-3. T.V. John Langworthy sings songs from his dreams at public venues.
3. Mike Joyce, “Somnolent Songs from Langworthy” (Washington, D.C.: Weekend Section, The Washington Post, September 18, 1992), p. 18. T.V. John's first album DREAM SONGS came to him in dreams.
4. Untitled, (Springfield, Virginia: Northern Virginia Rhythm, October, 1992), p. 3. T.V. John runs an open mic at Lone Star Grill in Arlington, Virginia. 
5. Susie Mudd, “Mid-Atlantic Region” (Music Monthly, October 1992). T.V. John is hosting a TV show for songwriters.
6. Tracy O’Shaughnessy, “Heading the Call to Boogie” (Potomac, Maryland: Potomac Almanac, October 14, 1992), pp. 1 and 18. T.V. John Langworthy sings songs that have come to him in dreams – with his Legendary Band.
7. “T.V. John signs for Asian Distribution” (Country Plus, January, 1993), p. 3. T.V. John's record company Maxern Records obtained distribution in Asia. Also, T.V. John's Legendary Band is the official house band for Lone Star Grill in Arlington, Virginia. 
8. Thomas C. Hall, “Elvis Stamp” (Washington, D.C.: Washington Business Journal, January 8, 1993), p. A-1. T.V. John Langworthy is interviewed about the release of the Elvis postage stamp. 
9. T.V. John Langworthy, Semi-Finalist for “How I Care”, Honorable Mention for “Living Star” and Honorable Mention for “Promised Land” (Washington, D.C.: Songwriters Association of Washington, 9th Annual Mid-Atlantic Song Contest, 1993).
10. “Local Music on the Air” (Northern Virginia Rhythm, op. cit. , February 1993), p. 3. T.V. John hosts a one-hour TV Show for songwriters.
11. “Finicky’s” (Northern Virginia Rhythm, op. cit. , April, 1993), p. 5. T.V. John and The Legendary Band perform on April 9.
12. “Sunset Grille” (Northern Virginia Rhythm, op. cit. , April, 1993), p. 6. T.V. John and The Legendary Band perform on August 16.
13. (Maryland: Music Monthly, September 1993). T.V. John Langworthy collaborated with the band Dakota.
14. Cable Channel 49 Program Schedule (Rockville, Maryland: Montgomery Cable Television), September, 1992-November, 1993. For one hour twice weekly, The T.V. John Show for songwriters, including himself, is broadcast on cable television. 
15. “T.V. John visits the Amphora Restaurant” (Fairfax, Virginia: The Connection, March 3, 1993), p. 5. T.V. John is recognized as a popular songwriter, band leader and television host. 
16. Buzz McClain, “Making His Dream Come True” (Washington, D.C.: Washington Times, December 23, 1993), pp. C10-11. God gives T.V. John songs in his dreams. T.V. John is a contemporary, award-winning songwriter who performs live, who records his songs on his own record label Maxern Records and who makes dream re-enactment music videos from his dreams. T.V. John also has a weekly television program “The T.V. John Show.” 
17. “T.V. John Langworthy lands television role” (Country Plus, January 1994). pp. 3 and 43. In addition to his own TV Show, T.V. John makes guest appearances on “Cornucopia”, “Lars from Mars”, “Grins” and “Lady Law.”
18. “Access Channels” (The Washington Post, op. cit., February 3, 1994), p. MC-67. The T.V. John Show is broadcast on Channel 19 in Montgomery County, Maryland for one hour twice weekly.
19. “Potomac Days” (The Gazette, op. cit., October 27, 1993), p. C-4. T.V. John performs at Potomac Day, Maryland on October 30, 1993.
20. “Mid-Atlantic Report” (Music Monthly, November, 1993), p. 10. “T.V. John has just delivered a 33-song music video.”
21. “Dreams come to life with T.V. John” (Country Plus, op. cit., December 1993), p. 8. T.V. John's fourth child is born. T.V. John continues to pursue his songwriting career on stage and television.
22. “Crosstown Jam Week 4/10-4/17” (Washington, D.C.: Washington City Paper, April 8, 1994), p. 45. T.V. John Langworthy performs live at Tex Mex Grill for WMZQ 106.7 FM Radio on April 16.
23. Photo of T.V. John Langworthy singing on stage at Tex Mex Grill in Arlington, Virginia. (Washington, D.C.: Weekend Section, The Washington Post, July 1, 1994), p. 24.
24. Steve Kiviat, “It Came From the Suburbs” (Washington, D.C.: Washington City Paper, February 24, 1995), p. 12. T.V. John appears with his Legendary Band in the premier of Jeff Krulik's film “Heavy Metal Parking Lot.” And then T.V. John sang live at the public reception, afterwards.
25. “Bethesda Notes” (Gathersburg, Maryland: The Gazette, June 17, 1996), p.A-2. T.V. John Langworthy is the composer and singer for the theater production of Mary McGowan Slappey's “Rider of Silver Spurs.”
26. Mary McGowan Slappey, “Rider of the Silver Spurs”, a musical play (Washington, D.C.: The Arts Club at the Historic Home of James Monroe), live May 5 and 12, 1996. T.V. John Langworthy, Composer and Music Director.
27. “Performance. Whole Lotta Fakin’ Going On. 100 Elvises” (The Washington Post, op. cit., May 25, 1998), p. B5. T.V. John Langworthy performed live at Gude Plaza in Rockville, Maryland on May 23.
28. T.V. John Langworthy, “Upside Down”, America at the Millenium: The Best Poems and Poets of the 20th Century (Columbia, Maryland: International Library of Poetry, October 30, 1999). Lyrics.
29. “Nightwatch: T.V. John”. (Weekend Section, The Washington Post, op. cit., September 1, 2000), p. 1.
30. “Poolesville Day” (Gaithersburg, Maryland: The Gazette, September 6, 2000), p. B14-15. The Legendary Band performs with T.V. John on September 9.
31. Jill Teunis, “18th Annual Germantown Oktober Fest” (The Gazette, op. cit., September 20, 2000), p. B-19. T.V. John Langworthy performs at 4:00 PM on September 23.
32. “Pop Quiz: Dream Along with T.V. John” (Washington City Paper, op. cit., May 11, 2001), p. 1.
33. Eric Brace, “Fun, Fun, Fun with T.V. John”. (Weekend Section, The Washington Post, op. cit., May 25, 2001), p. 2. “TV John (which stands for Texas Vision) is a Washington-area singer who receives his songs from God while he sleeps and then wakes up and records them.”
34. “Ideas for New Year’s Eve Procrastinators” (Weekend Section, The Washington Post, op.cit, December 29, 2001), page 5. “Charcoal Grill – T.V. John Langworthy” in Alexandria, Virginia.
35. David Segal,“Here & Now” (The Washington Post, op. cit., October 7, 2001), p.G3. T.V. John is “Pop Music” entertainer of the week, who gets his songs from God in dreams.
36. “Into the Night” (Gaithersburg, Maryland: The Gazette, November 14, 2001), p. B-7. T.V. John & The Legendary Band perform at Backstreets Cafe in Rockville, Maryland on November 17.
37. Eric Brace, “Can We Talk?” (Weekend Section, op. cit., March 8, 2002), p. 5. T.V. John recognized as “far-from-mainstream performer.”
38. Eric Brace, “The Circuit” (Weekend Section, op. cit., April 12, 2002), p. 7. T.V. John performs at Galaxy Hut on April 15 at Galaxy Hut in Arlington, Virginia.
39. Music Arts 101, “16th WAMA Crosstown Jam” (Washington, D.C.: Washington Area Music Association, April 20, 2002), p. 10. T.V. John & The Legendary Band perform at 8:00 in Joan Jett Room.
40. Wendy Harris, “Open After Dark” (New York, NY: Black Enterprise Magazine, June, 2005), p. 221. Photo of T.V. John by Welton B. Doby III.
41. “Velvet Lounge” (Washington, D.C.: Washington City Paper, July 22, 2005), p. 54. T. V. John and Friends perform on July 23.
42. Steven J. Michaels, Chairman, International Society of Poets letter (Owings Mills, Maryland, April 14, 2006). T.V. John Langworthy nominated as Poet of the Year of 2006.
43. Howard Ely, Publisher, The International Who's Who in Poetry letter (International Library of Poetry, op. cit., March 6, 2007). T.V. John Langworthy “selected for inclusion.” With certificate.
44. Hal David, Chairman/CEO, letter (New York, NY: Songwriters Hall of Fame, December 10, 2007). T.V. John Langworthy admitted in Songwriters Hall of Fame as a Professional Member.
45. Howard Ely, “Semi-finalist in International Open Poetry Contest”. (Columbia, Maryland: The International Library of Poetry, March 4, 2008). Awarded to the lyrics for T.V. John Langworthy's song “Party Animal.”
46. Howard Ely, “Editor’s Choice Award to T.V. John Langworthy For Outstanding Achievement In Poetry” (Columbia, Maryland: International Library of Poetry, April 15, 2008).
47. Becky Rusteberg, “Songwriters on Television get Worldwide Distribution”(Stevensville, Maryland: Chesapeake Music Guide, April 6, 2010), p. 3.
48. On local Washington, D.C. metropolitan television, The T.V. John Show gets worldwide distribution on YouTube.com. (Greenbelt, Maryland: Greenbelt News Review, April 8, 2010), p. 12
49. Becky Rusteberg, “T.V. John: the dream man” (ibid.), p. 6.
50. T.V. John Langworthy, “Local TV Show Receives Distribution Worldwide”(Greenbelt, Maryland: Greenbelt News Review, April 8, 2010), p. 12. The T.V. John Show gets worldwide distribution on YouTube.
51. Public Access Corporation of DC, “DCTV Viewers’ Choice Awards” (Washington, D.C., June 22, 2013.). p. 3. “John Langworthy - The T.V. John Show” was nominated for best in Entertainment.
52. Winter Arts Preview (Nashville, Tennessee: Nashville Scene, January 12, 2012), p. 48. T.V. John performs at FooBar with Fly Golden Eagle in Nashville on January 14.
53. Stacy Darlene, “Artist of the Month: T.V. John” (Las Vegas: Artist and Repertoire Review Magazine, March 2014), p. 13. T.V. John sings his “amazing” dream songs for Maxern Records and his television program as well as live with his ”incredible” Legendary Band.
54. T.V. John's record company "Maxern Records: Best Entertainers for 2014" in North Potomac" (North Potomac Awards Program, Maryland, December 3, 2014)

External links

 TV John Langworthy: God Wants You to Listen to My Dream Songs
 “TV John Show,” a Monthly Greenbelt Happening
 Blacktooth Records Releases TV John Langworthy's The Dream Man for Free; See 'Cell Phone' [Fresh Tracks + Fresh Vids]
 WFMU Beware of the Blog - The Awakening (featured in John Langworthy video)
 T.V. John Langworthy has turned thousands of his dreams into dream songs

1947 births
Living people